Podalia pseudopedacia is a moth of the Megalopygidae family. It was described by Paul Dognin in 1916.

References

Moths described in 1916
Megalopygidae